The SH-3A is a monophonic analog synthesizer that was manufactured by Roland from 1975 to 1981. It is unique in that it is capable of both the usual subtractive synthesis and also the less common additive synthesis, offering mixable waveforms at different footages. Two LFOs and a unique sample-and-hold section provided capabilities not found in competing self-contained synthesizers of the time. The SH-3A was Roland's first non-preset based synth. The predecessor, the Roland SH-1000, could also do this but didn't offer as much control as on the SH-3A. The rhythmic pulsing in the Blondie song "Heart of Glass" is an example of its sound.

Contrary to common belief, the initial version "SH-3" did not infringe on the transistor ladder-filter patent of Robert Moog. It used a diode filter like the EMS VCS 3. The SH-3A does use a transistor ladder-filter and as a result can generate Moog-like sounds.

Notable SH-3A users
 Blondie
 Chris Carter
 Covenant
 The Human League
 Radio Massacre International
 Vangelis

References

External links
 Roland SH-3A review by Bruce Gibbs on International Musician and Recording World (December 1975)
 Different Roland synthesizer filters
 Demo of SH-3A on YouTube

SH-3A
Analog synthesizers
Monophonic synthesizers
Musical instruments invented in the 1970s